Phi Kappa Psi, also called "Phi Psi", is an American collegiate social fraternity founded at Jefferson College in Canonsburg, Pennsylvania on February 19, 1852.  There are over a hundred chapters and colonies at accredited four year colleges and universities throughout the United States.

More than 112,000 men have been initiated into Phi Kappa Psi since its founding, and many have achieved recognition in their field.  Phi Psis in public service include U.S. President and Nobel Peace Prize recipient Woodrow Wilson, over a hundred members of Congress (including 18 senators and Speaker of the House Warren Keifer), three-term New York City Mayor and Bloomberg L.P. founder Mike Bloomberg, over a dozen state governors, two directors of the Peace Corps, and "Wild Bill" Donovan, the founding director of the Office of Strategic Services (the Central Intelligence Agency's predecessor) and recipient of the Medal of Honor and of the Freedom Award.  Academian Phi Psis include over a dozen university presidents (among these are Priestley Medal recipient Edgar Fahs Smith, and Presidential Medal of Freedom recipient Detlev Bronk), Rhodes scholars, and Pulitzer Prize-winning historian Frederick Jackson Turner.  Amidst the Phi Psis who have served in the military are dozens of generals and admirals, including "Father of the U.S. Air Force" Billy Mitchell, World War I Army Chief of Staff Tasker Bliss, National Security Agency director Kenneth Minihan, and three Judge Advocate Generals.  In the arts, Phi Psis have received Academy Awards, Emmys, Golden Globes, Grammys, and Tony Awards.  Journalist Sy Hersh has won the Pulitzer Prize, Orwell Award and George Polk Award.  Phi Psi businessmen include Bank of America founder Orra E. Monnette, Dow Chemical founder Herbert Dow, PIMCO founder Bill Gross, and Yahoo! founder Jerry Yang.  Three Phi Psis have served as presidents of the American Bar Association.  Sportsmen include Heisman Trophy winner Nile Kinnick, Olympic gold medalists including 7-time gold swimmer Mark Spitz, "Father of College Basketball Coaching" Phog Allen, NFL visionary Tex Schramm, and Commissioner of Baseball Ford Frick.

An active member of the fraternity is a full-time enrolled student at his chapter's host institution at the undergraduate, graduate, or post-graduate level; all others, including members who have graduated or transfer to a school without a Phi Psi chapter, are considered alumni.  Men may be initiated into Phi Kappa Psi either by an active chapter, or as part of a colony that is being installed as a chapter.  Members typically join Phi Kappa Psi when a chapter extends an offer to enter into a probationary period known as pledgeship, which lasts for six weeks and concludes with initiation.

Membership is normally only granted to men who are enrolled as full-time students at a chapter's host institution.  There have been three exceptions to this:
1. Alumni of a colony which became a chapter after their graduation, and for two years after.
2. Men who have been of service to a chapter, but not students at the institution.
3. Honorary membership extended to men of prominence, a practice that was banned in 1885.


Academia

Arts, entertainment, and journalism

Drama

Journalism and media

Literature

Music

Visual arts

Business

Government, law, and public policy

President

Cabinet and cabinet-level positions

Members of the United States Congress

United States Supreme Court

U.S. governors and lieutenant governors

Mayors

State and local legislators

Diplomats

Judges and lawyers

Other U.S. political and legal figures

Military

Religion

Science

Sports

Footnotes

References

Books

Periodicals

External links

Phi Kappa Psi's official web site
Phi Kappa Psi Foundation
The Political Graveyard: Phi Kappa Psi Politicians

brothers
Lists of members of United States student societies